Alexandre Soares (born 5 February 1973) is a former Brazilian professional footballer who played as a forward. He is known in Greece by the nickname "Giannis" which given to him by his then coach in Kalamata, Jacek Gmoch. He himself was so "tied" to this nickname that he baptized his little son who was born in Greece with the name "Giannis".

His given name also known as Alessandro.

Club career
Soares started his professional career in Montes Claros. In 1997, the contacts and connections of the then major shareholder of Kalamata, Stavros Papadopoulos, with the Brazilian market of football players, and suggested hid transfer to Greece. After a tryout by the then coach of the Messinians, Babis Tennes, he signed for the club playing with the team for four seasons.

In 2001 he was signed by OFI, where he played until 2004. In the summer of 2004, he caught the interest of Panathinaikos and AEK Athens. Eventually, the coach of the "greens", Zdeněk Ščasný suggested the acquisition of another striker, thus on 23 July 2004 he was signed by AEK, initially with a season-long loan and then by a permanent transfer. On his first season with the yellow-blacks he emerged as the club's top scorer, while playing 7 matches in the UEFA Cup scoring once against Gorica on 30 September 2004.  He repeatedly tried to obtain Greek citizenship but three times he fell victim to the change in legislation and the increase of the years of residence required for its granting.

In the summer of he moved to Cyprus and Anorthosis Famagusta. On 12 May 2007, he won Cypriot Cup scoring in the 3–2 final against Omonia. In the summer of 2007 he signed for Alki Larnaca, where he played for a season. In 2008 he also played for Cypriot Second Division side, Ermis Aradippou, helping them win promotion to the Cypriot First Division in 2009. Afterwards, he moved to Chalkanoras Idaliou, where he helped them win the Cypriot Third Division in 2010 by finishing as first scorer of the league with 17 goals.

Honours

Anorthosis Famagusta
Cypriot First Division: 2006–07
Cypriot Cup: 2006–07

Alki Larnaca
Cypriot Second Division: 2008–09

Chalkanoras Idaliou
Cypriot Third Division: 2009–10

Individual
Cypriot Third Division top scorer: 2009–10

References

External links

CBF 

1973 births
Living people
Brazilian footballers
Super League Greece players
Cypriot First Division players
Cypriot Second Division players
Anorthosis Famagusta F.C. players
Alki Larnaca FC players
Ermis Aradippou FC players
Kalamata F.C. players
AEK Athens F.C. players
OFI Crete F.C. players
Chalkanoras Idaliou players
Association football forwards
Brazilian expatriate footballers
Expatriate footballers in Greece
Expatriate footballers in Cyprus
Brazilian expatriate sportspeople in Greece
Brazilian expatriate sportspeople in Cyprus
Footballers from Rio de Janeiro (city)